Azhihe River Bridge is a  suspension bridge in the Liuzhi Special District, Guizhou, China. , it is among the fifty highest bridges in the world. The bridge is located on the Shuihuang highway between Guanling and Liupanshui. The 283 metre span crosses the valley of the Azhihe River, a small tributary of the Beipan River.

See also
List of highest bridges in the world

External links
https://web.archive.org/web/20120510120105/http://highestbridges.com/wiki/index.php?title=Azhihe_River_Bridge

Suspension bridges in China
Bridges in Guizhou
Bridges completed in 2003